Steve Chen (born August 25, 1978) is a Taiwanese-American Internet entrepreneur who is one of the co-founders and previous chief technology officer of the video-sharing website YouTube. After having co-founded the company AVOS Systems, Inc. and built the video-sharing app MixBit, he joined Google Ventures in 2014.

Early years and education 
Chen was born in Taipei, Taiwan. When he was seven years old, he and his family immigrated to the United States and settled in Prospect Heights, Illinois. He went to River Trails Middle School in Mount Prospect for his middle school education and John Hersey High School in Arlington Heights for his freshman year of high school. For his final three years of high school, he attended the Illinois Mathematics and Science Academy in Aurora, Illinois. At the University of Illinois at Urbana-Champaign, he studied computer science.

Business career 

Chen was an employee at PayPal, where he first met Chad Hurley and Jawed Karim. Chen was also an early employee at Facebook, although he left after several months to start YouTube.

In 2005, Chad Hurley, Jawed Karim and Steve Chen founded YouTube, with Chen having the position of chief technology officer. In June 2006, Chen was named by Business 2.0 as one of "The 50 people who matter now" in business.

On October 16, 2006, Chen and Hurley sold YouTube to Google, Inc. for $1.65 billion. Chen received 625,366 shares of Google and an additional 68,721 in a trust as part of the sale. As of September 2021, the Google shares are valued at almost $1.77 billion.

He and Hurley started AVOS Systems, which acquired Delicious from Yahoo! Inc.

Chen was listed as one of the 15 Asian Scientists To Watch by Asian Scientist Magazine on 15 May 2011.

Chen started the live streaming food network Nom.com in 2016 along with Vijay Karunamurthy. In 2017, Nom.com was shut down, with its Twitter feed switched to private and Facebook account left idle since March, 2017.

Awards 
Chen was inducted as a Laureate of The Lincoln Academy of Illinois and awarded the Order of Lincoln (the State's highest honor) by the Governor of Illinois in 2018.

Personal life 
Chen married Park Ji-hyun, who is now Jamie Chen, a Google Korea product marketing manager, in 2009. They now live in Taipei, Taiwan with their two children. One son was born in July 2010. The Chens are major supporters of the Asian Art Museum of San Francisco, where Jamie was appointed a trustee in July 2012. From August 2019, Chen moved back to Taiwan and resides there since then, along with his family.

See also 
 Jawed Karim
 Chad Hurley
 List of Taiwanese Americans
 Taiwanese Americans

References

External links 

 Steve Chen's YouTube profile
 Steve Chen, the local boy that created YouTube– Taipei Times, October 8, 2006

1978 births
American people of Taiwanese descent
American chief technology officers
American computer businesspeople
American technology chief executives
American technology company founders
Businesspeople in computing
Taiwanese company founders
Businesspeople from Taipei
Google employees
Internet pioneers
Living people
Members of Committee of 100
PayPal people
People from Prospect Heights, Illinois
People with acquired American citizenship
Taiwanese emigrants to the United States
Grainger College of Engineering alumni
YouTube
YouTube channels launched in 2005
John Hersey High School alumni